In the United Kingdom, the term military police refers to the three branches of the service police. Often, the term 'military police' is considered synonymous with the Army's Royal Military Police, but in fact, has a wider context. There are a number of civilian police forces whose role is to police other parts of the Defence Estate in the UK and overseas, but such forces are not correctly referred to as military police.

Service police

In the UK, service police are the formations of the British Armed Forces responsible for policing armed forces personnel. They are comparable to the provosts of other countries, however the term 'provost' in the UK has various uses including reference to the staff of military prisons and senior service police officers (e.g. the Provost Marshal). Each of the services has its own service police branch, a standalone unit responsible for policing, close protection of VIPs and, in the case of the Royal Military Police and Royal Air Force Police, other matters such as traffic control.

 The Royal Navy is policed by the Royal Navy Police, members of which are traditionally referred to as Regulators (or Master-at-Arms if a Chief Petty Officer or Warrant Officer). The Royal Navy Police also has Royal Marines specialising as Service Policemen. Prior to 2009, the Royal Marines Police was an independent organisation within the Corps of Royal Marines.
 The British Army is policed by the Royal Military Police. Enforcement of basic discipline within regiments is carried out by the Regimental Provost (sometimes incorrectly referred to as Regimental Police), who belong to individual regiments or corps.
 The Royal Air Force is policed by the Royal Air Force Police who are responsible not only for the policing of service personnel, but also a number of specialist security roles such as physical security, cybersecurity and information security. The RAF Police are the only branch of the Service Police to still operate with working dogs.

The Special Investigation Branch is the name given to the detective branches of all three Service police arms: the Royal Navy Police, Royal Military Police and Royal Air Force Police. SIB investigators usually operate in plain clothes, although they may wear uniform when serving overseas. Members are usually senior non-commissioned officers (sergeants or petty officers or above) or commissioned officers, although the Royal Air Force SIB employs corporals who perform the same function as all SIB investigators.

Jurisdiction in respect of civilians

In the United Kingdom

Service police are not constables under UK law and do not have any constabulary powers over the general public (other than 24a PACE 1984 or those on specialist assignments), however they have the full range of policing power that constables possess when dealing with service personnel or civilians subject to service discipline. However, the service police can utilise the powers, available to all persons in England and Wales, under Section 24(A) of the Police and Criminal Evidence Act 1984, which allows any person to arrest any individual they have reasonable grounds to believe is committing, or has committed, an indictable offence, or triable either way, and where a constable is not available to perform the arrest. They are allowed to use such force as is reasonable in the circumstance to achieve this. A similar power of arrest exists under Scottish common law, but there is a requirement to use the minimum amount of force and for the Military Police officer to have directly witnessed the individual commit the act for which they are arresting them.

The service police will patrol either independently or alongside civilian police officers from local territorial police forces. London's Soho is one example of this, in addition to various military towns such as Aldershot Garrison (where there are numerous barracks) and also in Plymouth due to its proximity to HMNB Devonport. During these joint patrols service police may sometimes assist territorial police officers, and may fully deal with arrested service personnel.

Postings overseas

Where service personnel are deployed overseas, the service police are often called upon to provide a complete policing service. In these situations, members of the service police can often exercise police powers in respect of civilians subject to service discipline. This includes, not exclusively, service dependents and overseas contractors sponsored by the British Armed Forces.

When deployed to the Falkland Isles, service police are sworn in as reserve constables by the Royal Falkland Islands Police, granting them civil as well as military policing powers on the islands.

Similarly when deployed to Ascension Island the Royal Saint Helena Police appoint service police officers as Special Constables.

Training

All service police receive their trade training at the Defence School of Policing and Guarding, and utilise the Service Police Crime Bureau operated by the RNP, RMP and RAFP. Each of the service police branches has its own Special Investigation Branch to undertake investigation of more serious crime and plain-clothes investigations.

Provosts

The British Military Correctional Training Centre (MCTC) at Colchester is operated by the Military Provost Staff Corps, an all-senior-NCO corps which only recruits from serving personnel. The staff of the Military Provost Staff Corps are known as provosts and fulfil a similar role to prison officers.

Regimental provosts

In addition to being policed by the Royal Military Police, the British Army has Regimental Provosts, who are members of individual regiments or corps with responsibility for discipline only within their own unit. Members of the Regimental Provost can be identified by the brassards they wear, which carry the letters "RP". They have no power of arrest over service personnel nor are they a police organisation per se. Their primary purpose is to enforce breaches of service discipline at a local unit level.

Civilian police forces

There are several civil police forces responsible to the Ministry of Defence. They each have specific roles and are staffed by police officers who are not part of the armed forces and have constabulary powers, thus they are not military police.

The Ministry of Defence Police is the UK based civilian police force of the Ministry of Defence. It is responsible for providing police, investigative and guarding services to Ministry of Defence property, personnel, and the Defence estate throughout the United Kingdom.
The Sovereign Base Areas Police provide policing services for both the Eastern and Western Sovereign Base Areas of Cyprus.
The Gibraltar Defence Police provide policing services on Ministry of Defence land and waters in Gibraltar.

See also
 Military police vehicle#United Kingdom

References